Antulio "Kobbo" Santarrosa (born 1949 in Mayaguez, Puerto Rico) is a puppeteer, television producer, journalist, comedian, actor, and author from Mayagüez, Puerto Rico. Santarrosa produce and puppeteer in La Comay, the highest rated TV show in the history of Television in Puerto Rico. Santarrosa is mostly known for three of his puppets: La Cháchara (The Tittle-Tattler), La Condesa (The Countess), and La Comay (The Gossiper). Santarrosa is also the author of Detrás de La Comay: biografía semi-autorizada.

The show SuperXclusivo was cancelled after being boycotted in 2012.
The puppeteer returns to Puerto Rican television for January 2019 with his character La Comay by Mega TV.

References

External links
 

Living people
People from Mayagüez, Puerto Rico
Puerto Rican television personalities
Puerto Rican television producers
1949 births